The simple station Humedal Córdoba is part of the TransMilenio mass-transit system of Bogotá, Colombia, which opened in the year 2000.

Location
The station is located in northwestern Bogotá, specifically on Avenida Suba, between las Calles 120 and 121.

It serves the Niza, Niza II, and Malibú neighborhoods.

History
In 2006, phase two of the TransMilenio system was completed, including the Avenida Suba line, on which this station is located.

The station is named Humedal Córdoba due to its proximity to this important body of water.

Nearby are the Ley store of Niza, the San Juan Crisóstomo church (Catholic), a Blockbuster, and the Bahía 123 shopping center.

On the night of April 25, 2011, an ambulance rammed one of the railings of the entry of this station, which suffered damage.

Station Services

Main Line Service

Feeder routes

This station does not have connections to feeder routes.

Inter-city service

This station does not have inter-city service.

External links
TransMilenio

See also
Bogotá
TransMilenio
List of TransMilenio Stations

TransMilenio